Yusuf Gatewood (born September 12, 1982, Hillsborough, North Carolina) is an American actor best known for playing Vincent Griffith in The Originals and Doug in the 2005 film The Interpreter. His television work includes guest roles on the television series Hack (2003), Law & Order: Criminal Intent (2003), CSI: Crime Scene Investigation (2006) and CSI: Miami (2007).  In 2020, he played the main cast role of Raymond Chestnut for season 2 of The Umbrella Academy.

Filmography

References

External links

Living people
American male film actors
American male television actors
1982 births